Holyrood Elementary School is a bilingual school in Edmonton, Alberta, Canada named after Holyrood Palace in Edinburgh, Scotland. The school is located in a south-east Edmonton neighborhood of the same name.

History 
Holyrood School opened in 1955 when Edmonton was growing rapidly due to the Post-World War II baby boom and discovery of oil near Edmonton in 1947. Holyrood introduced French immersion and Ukrainian bilingual programs in the 1970s, to make it a trilingual school.
Holyrood no longer has the Ukrainian bilingual program due to low enrolment, and now only offers French Immersion and English.

External links 
 Official Site
 Edmonton Public Schools Holyrood Page
 Holyrood Provincial Achievement Test Multiyear Reports

French-language schools in Alberta
Elementary schools in Edmonton
Educational institutions established in 1955
Bilingual schools
1955 establishments in Alberta